The United States District Court for the District of Alaska (in case citations, D. Alaska) is a federal court in the Ninth Circuit (except for patent claims and claims against the U.S. government under the Tucker Act, which are appealed to the Federal Circuit).

The District was established on July 7, 1958, pending Alaska statehood on January 3, 1959.

The United States Attorney's Office for the District of Alaska represents the United States in civil and criminal litigation in the court.  the United States Attorney is S. Lane Tucker.

Organization of the court 
The United States District Court for the District of Alaska is the sole federal judicial district in Alaska. Court for the District is held at Anchorage, Fairbanks, Juneau, Ketchikan,  and Nome.

Anchorage Division comprises the following borough/census areas: Aleutians East, Aleutians West, Anchorage, Bethel, Bristol Bay, Dillingham, Kenai Peninsula, Kodiak Island, Lake and Peninsula, Matanuska-Susitna, and Valdez-Cordova.

Fairbanks Division comprises the following borough/census areas: Denali, Fairbanks North Star, North Slope, Southeast Fairbanks, and Yukon-Koyukuk.

Juneau Division comprises the following borough/census areas: Haines, Hoonah-Angoon, Juneau, Petersburg, Sitka, Skagway, and Yakutat.

Ketchikan Division comprises the following borough/census areas: Ketchikan Gateway, Prince of Wales, and Wrangell.

Nome Division comprises the following borough/census areas: Nome, Northwest Arctic, and Kusilvak.

Current judges 
:

Vacancies and pending nominations

Former judges

Chief judges

Succession of seats

Territorial District Court 
From 1884 through 1959, the highest court in Alaska was a United States territorial court. In 1900, the court was enlarged from one to three judges, with each judge having a district. From 1900 till 1909, the districts were Juneau (First), Nome (Second), and Fairbanks (Third). In 1909, a fourth district and judge was added. From 1909 till 1959, the districts were Juneau (First), Nome (Second), Valdez and Anchorage (Third), and Fairbanks (Fourth).

See also 
 Courts of Alaska
 List of current United States district judges
 List of United States federal courthouses in Alaska

References

External links 
 United States District Court for the District of Alaska
 United States Attorney for the District of Alaska

1960 establishments in Alaska
Alaska law
Organizations based in Anchorage, Alaska
Alaska
Courts and tribunals established in 1960